This is a list of differential geometry topics. See also glossary of differential and metric geometry and list of Lie group topics.

Differential geometry of curves and surfaces

Differential geometry of curves

List of curves topics
Frenet–Serret formulas
Curves in differential geometry
Line element
Curvature
Radius of curvature
Osculating circle
Curve
Fenchel's theorem

Differential geometry of surfaces

Theorema egregium
Gauss–Bonnet theorem
First fundamental form
Second fundamental form
Gauss–Codazzi–Mainardi equations
Dupin indicatrix
Asymptotic curve
Curvature
Principal curvatures
Mean curvature
Gauss curvature
Elliptic point
Types of surfaces
Minimal surface
Ruled surface
Conical surface
Developable surface
Nadirashvili surface

Foundations

Calculus on manifolds
See also multivariable calculus, list of multivariable calculus topics

Manifold
Differentiable manifold
Smooth manifold
Banach manifold
Fréchet manifold
Tensor analysis
Tangent vector
Tangent space
Tangent bundle
Cotangent space
Cotangent bundle
Tensor
Tensor bundle
Vector field
Tensor field
Differential form
Exterior derivative
Lie derivative
pullback (differential geometry)
pushforward (differential)
jet (mathematics)
Contact (mathematics)
jet bundle
Frobenius theorem (differential topology)
Integral curve

Differential topology

Diffeomorphism
Large diffeomorphism
Orientability
characteristic class
Chern class
Pontrjagin class
spin structure
differentiable map
submersion
immersion
Embedding
Whitney embedding theorem
Critical value
Sard's theorem
Saddle point
Morse theory
Lie derivative
Hairy ball theorem
Poincaré–Hopf theorem
Stokes' theorem
De Rham cohomology
Sphere eversion
Frobenius theorem (differential topology)
Distribution (differential geometry)
integral curve
foliation
integrability conditions for differential systems

Fiber bundles
Fiber bundle
Principal bundle
Frame bundle
Hopf bundle
Associated bundle
Vector bundle
Tangent bundle
Cotangent bundle
Line bundle
Jet bundle

Fundamental structures
Sheaf (mathematics)
Pseudogroup
G-structure
synthetic differential geometry

Riemannian geometry

Fundamental notions
Metric tensor
Riemannian manifold
Pseudo-Riemannian manifold
Levi-Civita connection

Non-Euclidean geometry
Non-Euclidean geometry
Elliptic geometry
Spherical geometry
Sphere-world
Angle excess
hyperbolic geometry
 hyperbolic space
 hyperboloid model
 Poincaré disc model
 Poincaré half-plane model
 Poincaré metric
 Angle of parallelism

Geodesic
Prime geodesic
Geodesic flow
Exponential map (Lie theory)
Exponential map (Riemannian geometry)
Injectivity radius
Geodesic deviation equation
Jacobi field

Symmetric spaces (and related topics)
Riemannian symmetric space
Margulis lemma
Space form
Constant curvature
taut submanifold
Uniformization theorem
Myers theorem
Gromov's compactness theorem

Riemannian submanifolds
Gauss–Codazzi equations
Darboux frame
Hypersurface
Induced metric
Nash embedding theorem
minimal surface
Helicoid
Catenoid
Costa's minimal surface
Hsiang–Lawson's conjecture

Curvature of Riemannian manifolds
Theorema Egregium
Gauss–Bonnet theorem
Chern–Gauss–Bonnet theorem
Chern–Weil homomorphism
Gauss map
Second fundamental form
Curvature form
Riemann curvature tensor
Geodesic curvature
Scalar curvature
Sectional curvature
Ricci curvature, Ricci flat
Ricci decomposition
Schouten tensor
Weyl curvature
Ricci flow
Einstein manifold
Holonomy

Theorems in Riemannian geometry
Gauss–Bonnet theorem
Hopf–Rinow theorem
Cartan–Hadamard theorem
Myers theorem
Rauch comparison theorem
Morse index theorem
Synge theorem
Weinstein theorem
Toponogov theorem
Sphere theorem
Hodge theory
Uniformization theorem
Yamabe problem

Isometry
Killing vector field

Laplace–Beltrami operator
Hodge star operator
Weitzenböck identity
Laplacian operators in differential geometry

Formulas and other tools
List of coordinate charts
List of formulas in Riemannian geometry
Christoffel symbols

Related structures
Intrinsic metric
Pseudo-Riemannian manifold
Sub-Riemannian manifold
Finsler geometry
General relativity
G2 manifold
Information geometry
Fisher information metric

Lie groups

Connections

covariant derivative
 exterior covariant derivative
Levi-Civita connection
parallel transport
Development (differential geometry)
connection form
Cartan connection
affine connection
conformal connection
projective connection
method of moving frames
Cartan's equivalence method
Vierbein, tetrad
Cartan connection applications
Einstein–Cartan theory
connection (vector bundle)
connection (principal bundle)
Ehresmann connection
curvature
curvature form
holonomy, local holonomy
Chern–Weil homomorphism
Curvature vector
Curvature form
Curvature tensor
Cocurvature
torsion (differential geometry)

Complex manifolds
Riemann surface
Complex projective space
Kähler manifold
Dolbeault operator
CR manifold
Stein manifold
Almost complex structure
Hermitian manifold
Newlander–Nirenberg theorem
Generalized complex manifold
Calabi–Yau manifold
Hyperkähler manifold
K3 surface
hypercomplex manifold
Quaternion-Kähler manifold

Symplectic geometry
Symplectic topology
Symplectic space
Symplectic manifold
Symplectic structure
Symplectomorphism
Contact structure
Contact geometry
Hamiltonian system
Sasakian manifold
Poisson manifold

Conformal geometry
Möbius transformation
Conformal map
conformal connection
tractor bundle
Weyl curvature
Weyl–Schouten theorem

ambient construction
Willmore energy
Willmore flow

Index theory
Atiyah–Singer index theorem
de Rham cohomology
Dolbeault cohomology
elliptic complex
Hodge theory
pseudodifferential operator

Homogeneous spaces
Klein geometry, Erlangen programme
symmetric space
space form
Maurer–Cartan form
Examples
hyperbolic space
Gauss–Bolyai–Lobachevsky space
Grassmannian
Complex projective space
Real projective space
Euclidean space
Stiefel manifold
Upper half-plane
Sphere

Systolic geometry
Loewner's torus inequality
Pu's inequality
Gromov's inequality for complex projective space
Wirtinger inequality (2-forms)
Gromov's systolic inequality for essential manifolds
Essential manifold
Filling radius
Filling area conjecture
Bolza surface
First Hurwitz triplet
Hermite constant
Systoles of surfaces
Systolic freedom
Systolic category

Other

Envelope (mathematics)
Bäcklund transform

Differential geometry

Differential geometry
Differential geometry